It Takes a Thief is an American action-adventure television series that aired on ABC for three seasons between 1968 and 1970. It stars Robert Wagner in his television debut as sophisticated thief Alexander Mundy, who works for the U.S. government in return for his release from prison. The program features the adventures of Mundy, a cat burglar, pickpocket, and thief who steals to finance his life as a polished playboy and sophisticate. He is serving time in San Jobel prison when the U.S. government's SIA (the fictional Secret Intelligence Agency) proposes a deal to Mundy: steal for the government in exchange for his freedom. Mundy is puzzled and asks, "Let me get this straight. You want me to steal?" In the main opening titles, his new SIA boss, Noah Bain, uses the catch phrase, "Oh, look, Al, I'm not asking you to spy. I'm just asking you to steal."

This is a list of episodes for the television series.

Series overview

Episodes

Season 1 (1968)

Season 2 (1968–69)

Season 3 (1969–70)
Malachi Throne was no longer a regular cast member by this time, and his Noah Bain was no longer a regular character; Edward Binns's Wallie Powers had become Alexander Mundy's boss.

References

External links
 

It Takes a Thief (1968 TV series)